Highway 785 is a provincial highway in the Canadian province of Saskatchewan. It runs from Highway 12 to Highway 41 near Aberdeen. Highway 785 is about 53 km (33 mi.) long.

Highway 785 also passes near Hague. It connects with Highways 11 and 784.

Highway 785 crosses the South Saskatchewan River by the Hague Ferry.

See also 
Roads in Saskatchewan
Transportation in Saskatchewan

References 

785